Geoff Tamblyn (born 8 April 1949) is an Australian former cricketer. He played one first-class cricket match for Victoria in 1974.

See also
 List of Victoria first-class cricketers

References

External links
 

1949 births
Living people
Australian cricketers
Victoria cricketers
Cricketers from Melbourne